Vest-Agder County Municipality was the regional governing administration of the old Vest-Agder county in Norway. The county municipality was established on 1 January 1976 when the law was changed to allow elected county councils in Norway. The county municipality was dissolved on 1 January 2020, when Vest-Agder was merged with the neighboring Aust-Agder county, creating the new Agder county which is led by the Agder County Municipality. 

The administrative seat was located in the town of Kristiansand. 

Ann-Kristin Olsen was the last County Governor of Vest-Agder. The Governor was the representative of the King and Government of Norway in the county, functioning as the connection between the state and the municipalities.

County government
The Vest-Agder county council is made up of 35 representatives that were elected every four years. The council essentially acted as a Parliament or legislative body for the county and it met several times each year. The council is divided into standing committees and an executive board which meet considerably more often. Both the council and executive board are led by the County Mayor who held the executive powers of the county. From 2011 until its dissolution in 2020, it was Terje Damman of the Conservative Party and the Deputy County Mayor was Tore Askildsen of the Christian Democratic Party.

County council
The party breakdown of the council is as follows:

References

 
Vest-Agder
County municipalities of Norway
1976 establishments in Norway
2020 disestablishments in Norway